The 2012 Over the Limit was the third annual and final Over the Limit professional wrestling pay-per-view (PPV) event produced by WWE. It took place on May 20, 2012, at the PNC Arena in Raleigh, North Carolina. The name "Over the Limit" originally referred to the main event matches of the previous two events being contested as an "I Quit" match; for 2012, the title referred to the main event match being a No Disqualification match. In 2013, Over the Limit was going to be held in October but was replaced by Battleground.

Ten professional wrestling matches took place at the event, nine of which were broadcast live on pay-per-view. In the main event, John Laurinaitis defeated John Cena in a No Disqualification match. Also featured were CM Punk defeating Daniel Bryan to retain the WWE Championship, and Sheamus defeating Alberto Del Rio, Randy Orton, and Chris Jericho to retain the World Heavyweight Championship. 

The event garnered 167,000 buys, up from 140,000 the previous year's event received.

Production

Background
Over the Limit was an annual May pay-per-view (PPV) event produced by WWE since 2010. The original 2010 event replaced WWE's previous May PPV, Judgment Day, and was titled as a reference to its main event match being contested as an "I Quit" match. The 2012 event was the third event in the Over the Limit annual chronology. It took place on May 20, 2012, at the PNC Arena in Raleigh, North Carolina. Instead of an "I Quit" match, a No Disqualification match was contested as the main event for the 2012 event. This would also be the only Over the Limit to not occur during a brand extension, which had ended in August 2011.

Storylines
The professional wrestling matches featured professional wrestlers performing as characters in scripted events pre-determined by the hosting promotion, WWE. Storylines between the characters played out on WWE's primary television programs, Raw and SmackDown.

The main event feud was between John Cena and the General Manager of Raw and SmackDown, John Laurinaitis. On the night after losing to The Rock in the main event of WrestleMania XXVIII in early April, Cena's promo was interrupted by a returning Brock Lesnar, who immediately attacked him with an F-5. It was revealed the next week on Raw that Laurinaitis hired Lesnar to replace Cena as "the face of the WWE" by taking him out at Extreme Rules. A battered Cena barely managed to defeat Lesnar, and in a post-match promo, emphasized his injuries and announced he would be "taking a vacation." The next night on Raw, Lesnar attacked WWE COO Triple H (while he was arguing with Laurinaitis about the validity of Lesnar's contract), breaking his arm. With Lesnar's WWE job now in jeopardy, and after advice from his Executive Administrator Eve Torres, Laurinaitis decided on Cena's next opponent, for Over the Limit. Later that night, while Cena was in the ring, Laurinaitis appeared on the entrance stage to introduce Lord Tensai. Laurinaitis and Tensai then attacked Cena, and Laurinaitis revealed himself as Cena's opponent. The WWE Board of Directors stipulated the only way to win was via pinfall or submission, and anybody interfering in Laurinaitis' behalf would be immediately fired and, if Laurinaitis lost the match, he would be fired.

Another feud heading into Over the Limit was between WWE Champion CM Punk and Daniel Bryan. Following the Extreme Rules pay-per-view, Eve Torres announced Punk's next challenger would be decided by a series of Beat the Clock matches on the April 30 edition of Raw. In the final match of the evening, Bryan defeated Jerry Lawler in the fastest time to become the #1 contender.

Another storyline led to World Heavyweight Champion Sheamus defending his title in a fatal four-way match against Alberto Del Rio, Randy Orton, and Chris Jericho. Sheamus faced a returning Del Rio in a non-title match on the April 6 edition of SmackDown, where Del Rio defeated Sheamus via disqualification to earn a future title shot. On the May 7 episode of Raw, Sheamus and Orton faced Jericho and Del Rio in a tag team match. Jericho pinned Sheamus to win the match after Sheamus accidentally Brogue Kicked Orton. After the match, Orton gave Sheamus an RKO. Del Rio, Jericho, and Orton then all went into John Laurinaitis' office and demanded title opportunities against Sheamus, leading to a brawl between the three and Sheamus, which was broken up by officials. Laurinaitis then informed Sheamus that he would defend the World Heavyweight Championship against Del Rio, Jericho, and Orton in a fatal-four way match at Over the Limit.

Event

Pre-show 
During the pre-show, Zack Ryder faced  Kane. At the end of the match, as Ryder attempted the Rough Ryder on Kane, Kane performed a Chokeslam on Ryder to win the match.

Preliminary matches 
The actual pay-per-view opened with a 20 man Battle Royal for a United States Championship or Intercontinental Championship match. The match came down to The Miz, Tyson Kidd, David Otunga and Christian. After Miz and Otunga worked together to eliminate Kidd, Christian eliminated Otunga. Christian eliminated Miz to win the match. 

Next, Kofi Kingston and R Truth defended the Tag Team Championship against Dolph Ziggler and Jack Swagger. The match ended when Kingston executed Trouble in Paradise on Ziggler to retain the title. 

After that, Layla defended the Divas Championship against Beth Phoenix. Layla executed a Neckbreaker on Phoenix to retain the title. 

In the fourth match, Sheamus defended the World Heavyweight Championship against Chris Jericho, Randy Orton, and Alberto Del Rio (accompanied by Ricardo Rodriguez) in a Fatal 4-way match. The match came to an end when Sheamus executed White Noise on Jericho to retain the title.

Later, The Miz faced Brodus Clay (accompanied by his background dancers, Cameron and Naomi) in an impromptu match. Miz cut a promo in the ring where he was livid about losing on the pre-show and vented out his frustrations to WWE management before Clay came out. Clay executed a Running Splash on Miz to win the match.

In the sixth match, Cody Rhodes defended the Intercontinental Championship against Christian. Christian executed a Killswitch on Rhodes to win the title for a fourth time. 

Next, CM Punk defended the WWE Championship against Daniel Bryan. In the end, Bryan applied the Yes Lock on Punk but Punk managed to pin Bryan to retain the title despite submitting as the pinfall was counted.

In the penultimate match, Ryback faced Camacho (accompanied by Hunico). Ryback dominated Camacho throughout the match. In the end, Ryback delivered a Shell Shocked to Camacho to win the match.

Main event
In the main event, John Cena faced Raw and SmackDown General Manager John Laurinaitis in a No-Disqualification match with Laurinaitis' job on the line. Laurinaitis won as Big Show, who he had previously been fired for mocking his voice, interfered and turned heel by knocking Cena out with a WMD, allowing Laurinaitis to pin him and keep his job.

Aftermath
The 2012 Over the Limit was the final Over the Limit held. As Extreme Rules took the May 2013 PPV slot, Over the Limit was going to be held in October, but it was instead replaced by Battleground.

Results

Battle Royal

References

2012
2012 in North Carolina
Events in Raleigh, North Carolina
Professional wrestling in Raleigh, North Carolina
2012 WWE pay-per-view events
May 2012 events in the United States